Mark Handman (born 26 May 1971) is a South African cricketer. He played in sixteen first-class and nine List A matches between 1991 and 1995.

See also
 List of Eastern Province representative cricketers

References

External links
 

1971 births
Living people
South African cricketers
Eastern Province cricketers
KwaZulu-Natal cricketers
People from Greytown, KwaZulu-Natal